Hülchrath is a district of the municipality of Grevenbroich in North Rhine-Westphalia, Germany. It is known for its castle Schloss Hülchrath.

Position
The community Hülchrath borders in the east on the strategic railway embankment and on the locality Neukirchen (Newchurch) (Grevenbroich).

Villages in North Rhine-Westphalia